John Roland Stephens (born 2 September 1945) is an English former professional rugby league footballer who played in the 1960s and 1970s.

Background
John Stephens was born in Widnes, Lancashire. His birth was registered in Prescot, Lancashire, England. He was a restaurateur in Liverpool. As of 2008, he lives in Newcastle upon Tyne with his second wife Judith,  who he married after his first wife of over 40 years, Sue, died in tragic circumstances at the age of 59. John and Sue had 2 children together (Mark and Sarah) and 4 grand children (Lewis, James, Lydia and Sophie)

Playing career

International honours
John Stephens won caps for England while at Wigan in 1969 against Wales, and France, and in 1970 against France.

Challenge Cup Final appearances
John Stephens played right-, i.e. number 10, in St. Helens' 16-13 victory over Leeds in the 1972 Challenge Cup Final during the 1971-72 season at Wembley Stadium, London on Saturday 13 May 1972.

County Cup Final appearances
John Stephens played right-, i.e. number 10, in Wigan's 16-13 victory over Oldham in the 1966 Lancashire County Cup Final during the 1966–67 season at Station Road, Swinton on Saturday 29 October 1966, and played right- in Widnes' 6-2 victory over Salford in the 1974 Lancashire County Cup Final during the 1974–75 season at Central Park, Wigan on Saturday 2 November 1974.

BBC2 Floodlit Trophy Final appearances
John Stephens played left-, i.e. number 8, in Wigan's 7-4 victory over St. Helens in the 1968 BBC2 Floodlit Trophy Final during the 1968–69 season at Central Park, Wigan on Tuesday 17 December 1968, and played left- in the 6-11 defeat by Leigh in the 1969 BBC2 Floodlit Trophy Final during the 1969–70 season at Central Park, Wigan on Tuesday 16 December 1969.

References

External links
Profile at saints.org.uk
Profile at rugby.widnes.tv

1945 births
Living people
England national rugby league team players
English restaurateurs
English rugby league players
Lancashire rugby league team players
Rugby league players from Widnes
Rugby league props
St Helens R.F.C. players
Widnes Vikings players
Wigan Warriors players